KLAL (107.7 FM, "Alice @ 107.7") is a Top 40 (CHR) music formatted radio station in Little Rock, Arkansas (licensed to Wrightsville). The station is owned and operated by Cumulus Media.  The station's studios are located in West Little Rock, and the transmitter tower is located in Wrightsville.

Programming
Weekend programming includes Fox All Access Show, MTV Weekend Countdown, Open House Party Saturday and Sunday nights and Dawson McAllister Live.

References

External links
Official website

LAL-FM
Contemporary hit radio stations in the United States
Cumulus Media radio stations